Kalika Devi Temple is a Hindu temple in Belgaum, Karnataka dedicated to Shaktism.

History 

The place name is mentioned as Rishishringapura, Pirishingi, or Hirishingi in two records from the same place dated 1148 of Jagadekamalla and another dated 1186 of Someshwara IV. It was a noted commercial center.

As per the studies conducted by the department of archaeology, the temple of Shri Kalika Devi in Sirsangi might have been constructed during the first century. Sirsangi is a place which is prominent in Karnataka and this is due to the monuments and temples in and around this small village. Earlier this place was known as Pirising but later, during the Medieval era, the name was changed as Hirisingi.

Mythology
The temple of Shri Kalika Devi in Sirsangi is of mythological significance as its name is mentioned in many Hindu mythologies.

One such myth mentions that a saint by the name of Vrushya Shrunga was involved in penance in Vrushya Shrunga Tapovan, which is currently the place where the temple of Shri Kalika Devi is present. However, demons like Narundasur (Naragunda), Bettasura (Betasur) and Nalundasur (Navalagund) disturbed his meditation. Then the goddesses Chikkumbasura (Chikkumbi) and Hirekumbasura (Hirekumbi) killed these demons heeding the pleas of the ascetic Vrushya Shrunga. The goddesses later settled down here and hence the temple of Shri Kalika Devi was erected in Shirasangi.

Geography

There are two small hillocks at the outskirts of the village, one having a cave locally called Maunappanagavi and the hillock is called Kalluru Gudda ( kallu in Kannada language ಕಲ್ಲು means stone, Ooru ಊರು means town) . Inside the cave is a hill which can accommodate about 200 people; after this is a six-meter-long passage leading to a small pit having water. Another hillock near Kalika temple has a cave locally called Siddeshwaragavi, approachable by climbing nearly 200 steps and inside the cave there is a Shivalinga.

Worship
Depending upon devotees pledges, they put jaggery, wheat, coconuts, rice, edible oil, etc. equivalent to their weight in Tulaa Bhara Seva.
Anna Dasoha seva is also a part of worship.

Temple activities
Many devotees, to complete their vows and pledges on their behalf or on behalf of their family members and also to follow traditional vows.

Festivals

Ugadi
Ugadi is one of the major festivals celebrated by Vishwakarmas of this region. The Vishwakarma Samaj Vikas Samsthe organizes religious and cultural programmes on the Amavasya(Dark-moon Day). Devotees offer wheat grown in their fields to the goddess. The famous "Butti" ritual is performed during the early hours of the Padyami.

Halegodi Amavasya 
Halegodi Amavasya is celebrated next to Ugadi Amavasya.

Vishwakarma Mahotsava
This is grandly celebrated on Chatti Amavasya every year.

Vishwakarma caste
Vishwakarma Caste (also known as Vishwabrahmin / Dhiman Brahmins / Brahmins) describes a Brahmin Caste of India who claim to be descendants of Lord Vishwakarma. They are a caste of  engineers, architects, sculptors, temple builders and artists. The term is applied to five sub-castes; blacksmiths, carpenters, coppersmiths, goldsmiths and sculptors.

The contribution of the Vishwakarmis to Hindu art and architecture is immense. The University of Nalanda has been an architectural marvel for ages together as also the iron pillars of Delhi. At the same time Hindu architecture as well as Buddhist architecture represents great contributions of the Vishwakarmis.

Tradition says that the Vishwakarmi castes are subdivided according to the names of their sons. The sons of Lord Vishwakarma were Manu, Maya, Thwastha, Silpi and Vishvajnya. People belonging to the Manu cast are blacksmiths; those of the Manu group are carpenters. The metal craftsmen are known as Thwastha and those who are goldsmiths are called by the name Vishyajnya.

The Vishwakarmi castes have been subdivided into five gotras each corresponding to the name of a Rishi which has been mentioned in the Yajur Veda. The five gotras of the Vishwakarmi are Sanagasya Manu, Sanatanasya Maya, Abhuvanasya Tvashta, Pratanansya SiIpi and Suparnasya Vishvajna. The five gotras of the Vishwakarmis are again subdivided into 25 sub-clans.

Transportation

Road
The Kalika Devi temple at Sirsangi is 62 km from Dharwad and is on the Dharwad–Bijapur route. It is around 2 km from the bus stand at Sirsangi.

Air

The nearest airport is Belgaum which is around 100 km and Hubli around 72 km from Shri Kalika Devi Temple at Sirsangi.

Rail
The nearest railway station is located at Belgaum. There are daily trains which connect Belgaum to other spots in Karnataka.

References 

Hindu temples in Belagavi district
Devi temples in Karnataka